Ann Gardner (born 1947) is an American glass artist known for her large-scale sculptural and architectural installations.

She was born in Eugene, Oregon.

Career
Gardner began her career studying at the University of Oregon. In 1974, she received a degree in Ceramics and Fine Arts from Portland State University. As a developing artist, she incorporated painting, ceramics, and drawing into her work.  Gardener moved to Seattle in 1979 where she continues to work.

Gardner's early training and work used hand-painted ceramics. In 1985, Dale Chihuly invited her to be an artist-in-residence at the Pilchuck Glass School where she adapted her ceramics experience to working with glass.  During her second residency at Pilchuck, Gardener developed techniques that lead her towards the use of largely monochromatic glass tiles (tessera) and mosaics. She is best known for using these techniques to create large-scale architectural installations and sculpture, such as Convergence, Lebeg, and Earth, Fields, Forest, Night, Sun and Water. 

Gardner has her work featured in the collections of the Corning Museum of Glass, the Seattle Art Museum, the Tacoma Art Museum, the American Museum of Crafts in New York City, among other places.

Awards 
Gardner has worked as Artist in Residence at the Pilchuck Glass School and Museum of Glass, and received multiple National Endowment for the Arts fellowships.  In 1993 she was awarded the Louis Comfort Tiffany Award.  Her work Ring of Water was recognized in 2004 as one of the best public art projects by Americans for the Arts.  Fog received the Juror's Choice Award in New Glass Review. In 2011, Gardener became the first mosaic artist to receive the Rakow Commission for her work Five Pods.

References

External links
 Ann Gardener website
 2011 Rakow Commission Artist: Ann Gardner (video)
 Meet the Artist: Ann Gardener (video)

American glass artists
Women glass artists
Living people
1947 births
Mosaic artists
Pacific Northwest artists
20th-century American sculptors
21st-century American sculptors
American installation artists
American women installation artists
Recipients of the Rakow Commission
Artists from Eugene, Oregon
Portland State University alumni
20th-century American women artists
21st-century American women artists